In Greek mythology, Cephalus (Ancient Greek: Κέφαλος Kephalos) is a Aeolian prince, the son of Deion/ Deioneos, ruler of Phocis, and Diomede, and grandson of Aeolus. He was one of the lovers of the dawn goddess Eos.

Etymology 
The word kephalos is Greek for "head", perhaps used here because Cephalus was the founding "head" of a great family that includes Odysseus. It could be that Cephalus means the head of the Sun who kills (evaporates) Procris (dew) with his unerring ray or 'javelin'.

Sumptuous sacrifices for Cephalus and for Procris are required in the inscribed sacred calendar of Thorikos in southern Attica, dating perhaps to the 430s BCE and published from the stone in 1983.

Family 
Cephalus was the brother of Aenetus, Phylacus, Actor and Asterodia. By Procris or Procne, he was the father of Arcesius or Archius and by Clymene, daughter of Minyas, of Iphiclus and Alcimede. In some accounts, he was called the father of Oia, wife of Charops and eponym of the deme Oia in Attica. A son of Cephalus, Canes was said to be a king of Phocis and husband of Evadne, daughter of Pelias.

Mythology

Cephalus and Procris 
Athenians localised the myth by asserting that Cephalus was married to Procris, a daughter of Erechtheus, an ancient founding-figure of Athens. The goddess of dawn, Eos, fell in love with him and kidnapped Cephalus against his will when he was hunting. Eos bore the resistant Cephalus a son named Phaethon (not to be confused with the son of the sun-god Helios). Some sources also give Tithonos and Hesperus as children of Cephalus and Eos. However, Cephalus never accepted Eos, and always pined for Procris, causing a disgruntled Eos to return him to her, making disparaging remarks about his wife's fidelity. Bribed by a golden crown, his wife admitted Pteleon to her bed, and being detected by Cephalus she fled to Minos. Alternatively, Eos disguised Cephalus as a common man, who then propositioned Procris. Procris at first refused, but eventually gave in, whereupon the hurt Cephalus revealed himself, causing Procris to flee.

Procris later on came back to Athens, and once reunited with her after an interval of eight years, Cephalus tested her by returning from the hunt in disguise, and managing to seduce her. In shame Procris fled to the forest, to hunt with Artemis. In returning and reconciling, Procris brought two magical gifts, an inerrant javelin that never missed its mark, and a hunting hound, Laelaps that always caught its prey. The hound met its end chasing a fox (the Teumessian vixen) which could not be caught; both fox and the hound were turned into stone. But the javelin continued to be used by Cephalus, who was an avid hunter. Procris then conceived doubts about her husband, who left his bride at the bridal chamber and climbed to a mountaintop and sang a hymn invoking Nephele, "cloud". Procris became convinced that he was serenading a lover. She climbed to where he was to spy on him. Cephalus, hearing a stirring in the brush and thinking the noise came from an animal, threw the never-erring javelin in the direction of the sound – and Procris was impaled. As she lay dying in his arms, she told him "On our wedding vows, please never marry Eos". Cephalus was distraught at the death of his beloved Procris, and went into exile in Thebes.

The primary literary source for the story is the poet Pherecydes of Athens, preserved in a quoted fragment (Pherecydes Fr. 34) in the so-called "Mythographus Homericus"; a papyrus (PBerolinensis 13282) representing a parallel text based on the same source confirms the details.

Amphitryon's campaign 
In a separate episode that is simply an aition explaining the name of Cephallenia and reinforcing its cultural connections with Athens, Cephalus helped Amphitryon of Mycenae in a war against the Taphians and Teleboans. He was awarded with the island of Samos, which thereafter came to be known as Cephallenia. The people who lived on Cephallenia and nearby islands came to be known as Cephallenians.

Cephalus eventually married again, choosing a daughter of Minyas to be his wife. This woman (named Clymene, according to some sources) bore him a son named Arcesius. In another version, Cephalus consulted an oracle, and the oracle told him that if he wished to have a son, he should mate with the first female being he saw. Cephalus then encountered a she-bear, and mated with the animal. She then transformed into a human woman and bore him Arcesius. Arcesius succeeded Cephalus as ruler of his Cephallenian realm. This Arcesius was sometimes said to be the grandfather of Odysseus. In another version he had four sons after which four cities were named: Same, Crane, Pali, Pronnoi. These are the cities who later became the four city-states of Cephallenia. Nevertheless, Cephalus never forgave himself over the death of Procris, and he committed suicide by leaping from Cape Leucas into the sea.

In literature 
The legend of Cephalus and Procris figures twice in Ovid: in the third book of Ars Amatoria and in the seventh book of the Metamorphoses. It is retold in Cephalus and Procris; Narcissus, a 1595 poem by Thomas Edwards. It is echoed in Shakespeare's Midsummer Night's Dream (Act V, scene i), where Pyramus and Thisbe refer to "Shafalus" and "Procrus."  While Milton's "the Attic boy" in Il Penseroso is also a reference to Cephalus.

Operatic treatments include Caccini's Il rapimento di Cefalo (c. 1600), André Grétry's Céphale et Procris (1773), and Ernst Krenek's Cefalo e Procri (1934), as well as works by Hidalgo (1660), Elisabeth Jacquet de la Guerre (1694), and Johann Philipp Krieger (1690).

References

Further reading 
 Apollodorus, The Library with an English Translation by Sir James George Frazer, F.B.A., F.R.S. in 2 Volumes, Cambridge, MA, Harvard University Press; London, William Heinemann Ltd. 1921. ISBN 0-674-99135-4. Online version at the Perseus Digital Library. Greek text available from the same website.
Diodorus Siculus, The Library of History translated by Charles Henry Oldfather. Twelve volumes. Loeb Classical Library. Cambridge, Massachusetts: Harvard University Press; London: William Heinemann, Ltd. 1989. Vol. 3. Books 4.59–8. Online version at Bill Thayer's Web Site
Diodorus Siculus, Bibliotheca Historica. Vol 1-2. Immanel Bekker. Ludwig Dindorf. Friedrich Vogel. in aedibus B. G. Teubneri. Leipzig. 1888-1890. Greek text available at the Perseus Digital Library.
Fowler, Robert L. "The Myth of Kephalos as an Aition of Rain-Magic (Pherekydes FGrHist 3 F 34)." Zeitschrift Für Papyrologie Und Epigraphik 97 (1993): 29-42. www.jstor.org/stable/20171904.
Gaius Julius Hyginus, Fabulae from The Myths of Hyginus translated and edited by Mary Grant. University of Kansas Publications in Humanistic Studies. Online version at the Topos Text Project.
Hard, Robin, The Routledge Handbook of Greek Mythology: Based on H.J. Rose's "Handbook of Greek Mythology", Psychology Press, 2004, . Google Books.
Hesiod, Catalogue of Women from Homeric Hymns, Epic Cycle, Homerica translated by Evelyn-White, H G. Loeb Classical Library Volume 57. London: William Heinemann, 1914. Online version at theio.com
Suida, Suda Encyclopedia translated by Ross Scaife, David Whitehead, William Hutton, Catharine Roth, Jennifer Benedict, Gregory Hays, Malcolm Heath Sean M. Redmond, Nicholas Fincher, Patrick Rourke, Elizabeth Vandiver, Raphael Finkel, Frederick Williams, Carl Widstrand, Robert Dyer, Joseph L. Rife, Oliver Phillips and many others. Online version at the Topos Text Project.

External links 

 John Flaxman's statue 'Cephalus and Aurora' at the Lady Lever Art Gallery
 Dictionary of Greek and Roman Biography and Mythology Cephalus
 Images of Cephalus and Aurora and Cephalus and Procris in the Warburg Institute Iconographic Database
 Legend illustrated by Bernardino Luini in the National Gallery of Art.

Mythological hunters
Princes in Greek mythology
Consorts of Eos
Phocian characters in Greek mythology
Metamorphoses characters
Attic mythology
Mythology of Heracles
Mythology of Phocis
Mythological rape victims
Zoophilia in culture